Mark J Constable (born 1976) is a retired male badminton player who has represented England and Jersey. He won the English National Badminton Championships men's singles title in 2002 and represented Team England 27 times in various team events spreading over Sudirman Cup, Thomas Cup, Commonwealth Games and other international matches.

Biography
Constable represented England and won a bronze medal in the men's team event, at the 1998 Commonwealth Games in Kuala Lumpur, Malaysia.

Four years later he competed in the 2002 Commonwealth Games in Manchester where he helped Team England to win the Gold Medal. Mark retired shortly after the Manchester Games due to a severe knee injury and moved to the Channel Islands in 2003. He became the Jersey Island coach on a part-time basis and coached during the Melbourne 2006 CWG but returned in 2014 as a competitor to represent Team Jersey at the 2014 Commonwealth Games.

He represented Jersey at the Island Games 2015 where he won the men's singles and team gold medal titles. He followed on two years later to defend his title at the NatWest Island Games to again win individual gold in the men's singles event and also helped in securing the team silver medal.

Mark was Jersey's Badminton Development Officer from 2014 until 2018.

References

English male badminton players
Living people
1976 births
Commonwealth Games medallists in badminton
Commonwealth Games bronze medallists for England
Badminton players at the 1998 Commonwealth Games
Badminton players at the 2002 Commonwealth Games
Jersey badminton players
Badminton players at the 2014 Commonwealth Games
Medallists at the 1998 Commonwealth Games